The South Carolina Open is the South Carolina state open golf tournament, open to both amateurs and PGA professionals. It is organized by the Carolinas section of the PGA of America, and both state opens run by the Carolinas section, the North Carolina Open and the South Carolina Open, are the only ones in the United States that prohibit non-PGA professionals from competing. It has been played annually since 1952 at a variety of courses around the state.

Winners

2022 Andrew Cheek
2021 Derek Watson
2020 No tournament
2019 Derek Watson
2018 Jack Faraci (amateur)
2017 Tate Hoisington (amateur)
2016 Matt Bova
2015 Cory Schneider
2014 Rohan Allwood
2013 John Patterson (amateur)
2012 Jerry Haas
2011 Jordan Pomeranz
2010 Charles Frost
2009 Billy Anderson
2008 Len Calvert
2007 Kelly Mitchum
2006 Jordan Pomeranz (amateur)
2005 Kelly Mitchum
2004 Stephen Isley
2003 Kelly Mitchum
2002 Jeff Lankford
2001 Gregg Jones (amateur)
2000 Tim Dunlavey
1999 Mike Bright (amateur)
1998 Randy Few
1997 Bill Lewis
1996 Jason Smoak
1995 Tim Dunlavey
1994 Bob Boyd
1993 Bob Boyd
1992 Bob Boyd
1991 Barry Black (amateur)
1990 Barry Black (amateur)
1989 Bob Boyd
1988 Mike Lawrence
1987 Mike Lawrence
1986 Vic Lipscomb
1985 Bob Boyd
1984 Mike Lawrence
1983 Mike Bright
1982 Vic Lipscomb
1981 Randy Glover
1980 Randy Glover
1979 Vic Lipscomb
1978 Terry Florence
1977 Randy Glover
1976 Terry Florence
1975 Dick Horne (amateur)
1974 Russell Glover
1973 Randy Glover
1972 Randy Glover
1971 Randy Glover
1970 Randy Glover
1969 Randy Glover
1968 Jack Lewis Jr. (amateur)
1967 Norman Flynn
1966 Tommy Cuthbert (amateur)
1965 Harold Kneece
1964 Dillard Traynham (amateur)
1963 Tony Evans
1962 Bert Yancey
1961 Harold Kneece
1960 Harold Kneece
1959 Joe Zarhardt
1958 Melvin Hemphill
1957 Mack Briggs
1956 Harley Long (amateur)
1955 Orville White
1954 Orville White
1953 Orville White
1952 Steve Duda

External links
PGA of America – Carolinas section
List of winners

Golf in South Carolina
PGA of America sectional tournaments
State Open golf tournaments
Recurring sporting events established in 1952
1952 establishments in South Carolina